Dvigrad ("Twin-town"; , Istriot: Docastei), is an abandoned medieval town in central Istria, Croatia. It is located in the Draga valley. The history of the settlement is prehistoric; it remained inhabited until the 18th century.

The Regional Programme for Cultural and Natural Heritage in South East Europe is attempting to preserve and reconstruct the town.

References

External links 

 http://www.kanfanar.hr/kultura/dvigrad
 Dvigrad at InfoRovinj

Ghost towns in Croatia
Former populated places in Croatia
Castles in Croatia
Buildings and structures in Istria County
Tourist attractions in Istria County